Brandan is a given name and surname. Notable people with the name include:

Given name
Brandan Craig (born 2004), American soccer player
Brandan Greczkowski (born 1997), American judoka 
Brandan Kearney (born 1993), American basketball player
Brandan Parfitt (born 1998), Australian rules footballer
Brandan Robertson (born 1992), American writer and minister
Brandan Schieppati (born 1980), American singer
Brandan Wilkinson (born 1997),  Scottish rugby league footballer
Brandan Wright (born 1987), American basketball player

Surname
Cory Brandan (born 1976), American singer

See also
Brandán, surname
Branden (given name)
Branden (surname)
Brandin, given name and surname
Brandon (given name)
Brandon (surname)